Astero is a 1959 Greek drama film directed by Dinos Dimopoulos. It was entered into the 9th Berlin International Film Festival.

Cast
 Aliki Vougiouklaki - Astero
 Titos Vandis - Mitros Pithokoukouras
 Dimitris Papamichael - Thymios Pithokoukouras
 Georgia Vasileiadou - Stamatina
 Stephanos Stratigos - Thanos
 Yorgos Damasiotis - Thanasis
 Kostas Papachristos - Mitsos
 Athanasia Moustaka -Pithokoukoura
 Giannis Avlonitis
 Niki Linardou - (as Bebi Koula)

References

External links

1959 films
1950s Greek-language films
1959 drama films
Greek black-and-white films
Films directed by Dinos Dimopoulos
Finos Film films
Films shot in Epirus
Films set in Greece
Greek drama films